The Xiaomi 13 is a series of Android-based smartphones manufactured by Xiaomi. Xiaomi 13 and 13 Pro were announced on 11 December, 2022 and were released in China on December 14, 2022. The phones were released internationally on February 26, 2023 with  Xiaomi 13 Lite.

References

External links 
  - Xiaomi 13
  - Xiaomi 13 Pro
  - Xiaomi 13 Lite

Mobile phones introduced in 2022
Mobile phones introduced in 2023
Android (operating system) devices
Flagship smartphones
13
Mobile phones with multiple rear cameras
Mobile phones with 8K video recording